Seathorne is a small coastal village in the East Lindsey district of Lincolnshire, England.

The area was developed in 1925, with the development of the Seathorne Estate. By 1931, the town's population had reached 9,122.

References

External links 

 

Villages in Lincolnshire
Populated coastal places in Lincolnshire
East Lindsey District